Metro Davao, one of the three metropolitan areas in the Philippines, is home to numerous high-rise buildings. Most of these are located in Davao City, which has seen a lot of high-rises sprout throughout the years. Surrounding cities, however, which are also part of Metro Davao, such as Tagum, Panabo, and Digos contain very little high-rise buildings. One of the factors affecting the number of high-rises in those areas would be Davao City's land area, which is nearly four times the size of Metro Manila. Within Davao City, most high-rises are concentrated within Poblacion District, however, the neighboring districts of Agdao, Buhangin, and Talomo are now home to some of the city's tallest buildings. Currently, the tallest building in Davao City and Mindanao is Vivaldi Residences Davao.

Building height regulation 
Because the city's airport is located near the city center, the Civil Aviation Authority of the Philippines imposes a height limit along the airport's flight path, which includes a large part of the city center. According to a 2019 amendment to the city's zoning code for 2013-2022, the maximum premium building height for buildings along the flight path is 100 meters above mean sea level (AMSL). The city government states other reasons for the building height regulation policy, such as preserving the view of cultural sites, improve urban livability through cleaner air, access to sunlight, and the like, and incentivize the private sector to improve on what has already been built.

However, the city government may allow for one building to serve as the city's tallest "landmark building" that must meet the criteria that the building's design is unique and should bear semblance to or representation of Davao City's culture and heritage. It must also devote at least half of its ground floor area to the public and make the summit accessible to the public for viewing and tourism purposes either with or without a fee. Finally, the usable floor spaces must be at least 70% non-residential development.

Tallest completed buildings
This list ranks high-rise buildings in Davao City with at least 12 floors or stand at least 49 meters (161 feet) tall.

Updated February 21, 2023 - CAT

Tallest buildings under construction
Only buildings with at least 12 floors are included in this list.

Tallest proposed buildings 
Buildings which have not yet started construction work and contains at least 12 floors are included in this list.

See also
 List of tallest buildings in Asia
 List of tallest buildings in the Philippines

 List of tallest buildings in Cagayan de Oro

References

Davao City
Tallest buildings